House of Xiao may refer to the ruling houses of these successive dynasties:

Southern Qi (479–502)
Liang dynasty (502–557)
Western Liang (555–587)